The Commission for Missing Persons and Victims of Violence is an Indonesian human rights organization established in 1998 to investigate forced disappearances and acts of violence. It was founded by human rights activist Munir Said Thalib, who in 2004 was poisoned on a flight to Amsterdam.

References

Missing people organizations
Human rights organizations based in Indonesia